The Sunday Game is RTÉ's main Gaelic games television programme. It is shown on RTÉ2 every Sunday during the Football Championship and Hurling Championship seasons.  It is one of RTÉ2's longest-running shows, having been on air since 1979, one year after the channel first began broadcasting.  It celebrated its 30th season in 2008.

Gaelic games broadcasting

Early years
Gaelic football and hurling have always been at the heart of broadcasting in Ireland from its earliest days. 2RN, Ireland's first radio broadcasting station, was established on 1 January 1926 and, from the outset, sports coverage, albeit infrequent, was a feature of the schedules.  Early broadcasts consisted of team announcements and short reports on events of interest.

2RN, however, recorded a broadcasting first on 29 August 1926.  On that day former hurler and renowned Gaelic games journalist, P. D. Mehigan, carried a live commentary of Kilkenny's All-Ireland hurling semi-final victory over Galway.  It was the first live radio broadcast of a field game outside of the United States.

When Telefís Éireann was established on 31 December 1961, the new television station became interested in the broadcasting of the national games.  The Gaelic Athletic Association, however, were wary the live television coverage would result in lower attendances at games.  Because of this, the association restricted annual coverage of its games to the All-Ireland hurling and football finals, the two All-Ireland football semi-finals and the two Railway Cup finals.

The first time that Gaelic games were seen on Irish television was on 17 March 1962 when Telefís Éireann carried live coverage of the Railway Cup hurling final between Munster and Leinster.  The football decider followed this.  Before then highlights of games were shown on cinema newsreels filmed by the National Film Institute (now the IFI), while highlights of the 1959 All-Ireland hurling final were broadcast by the BBC, with Kenneth Wolstenholme commentating. Since 1962, however, the broadcasting of Gaelic games, albeit limited, became a key part of the new television station's schedule.  On 5 September 1971 history was made again when Tipperary's defeat of Kilkenny in the All-Ireland final was the first game to be broadcast in colour.

The Sunday Game
The first edition of The Sunday Game was broadcast on RTÉ2 on Sunday, 8 July 1979. Introduced by Jim Carney, it showed only one match; the Munster hurling final between Cork and Limerick; Cork won 2–14 to 0–9. Bill O'Herlihy also co-presented the first edition of The Sunday Game with Jim Carney. For the early years financial and logistical reasons restricted the programme to featuring just one full championship game and discussion about it.  The show, however, soon expanded featuring coverage of one or more of the day's main championship games, followed by extended highlights of the other major games of the day.  This format still continues.

The Sunday Game was only a few weeks old when it courted its first controversy.  On 29 July 1979 the programme showed the Leinster football final between Dublin and Offaly.  Dublin narrowly won the game, however, Jimmy Keaveney was sent off for a foul on Offaly's Ollie Minnock.  In the discussion about the game analyst Liz Howard put forward the view that the sending off was very harsh.  The following day the Irish Press newspaper carried the headline: 'TV personality supports Jimmy Keaveney' on the front page.  Howard subsequently attended a Leinster Council disciplinary committee meeting and spoke on Keaveney's behalf, however, he received a one-month suspension.

For most of the 1980s, RTÉ was still restricted to just showing live coverage of the All-Ireland finals and semi-finals in both hurling and football.  This changed in 1989 when the Munster hurling final between Tipperary and Waterford was broadcast live for the first time.  Since then RTÉ has gained the rights to show all of the provincial hurling and football finals live as well as many other earlier provincial and qualifier games.  The station broadcasts these and many other games under "The Sunday Game Live" banner.  This programme usually contains live coverage of two games.  In 2007 The Sunday Game broadcast 50 live championship games. In 2008 the programme broadcast 40 live championship games due to the fact that rival broadcaster, TV3, was granted the rights to show live championship games for the first time ever.

The Sunday Game programme only covers the championship season from May to September.  All of the GAA's National League games are screened on TG4 and Setanta Sports, while Sunday Sport on RTÉ Two provides highlights of some of these games.  When a hurling or football game is shown live on Saturday or Monday – the latter becoming more common during Summer Bank Holiday weekends – the appropriately customised title The Saturday Game or The Monday Game is used. Previously The Game on Monday, a second selection of highlights, had also been aired, before being dropped in 2000. Live coverage of Championship matches in the UK on Premier Sports will use the RTÉ feed and until 2014 TV3's coverage.

Aside from the two senior championships, The Sunday Game Live previously covered the finals of four other championships: the All-Ireland Minor Football Championship and the All-Ireland Minor Hurling Championship in 2014 these rights went to TG4. RTÉ still shows the Senior, Intermediate and Junior All-Ireland Camogie Championship finals and has in recent seasons expanded its coverage to show the Quarter and Semi Finals of the senior championship. 
For the minor (under-18) matches, the commentary is traditionally in the Irish language and was performed by Micheal O Sé. The All-Ireland Ladies Football Championship senior and junior finals were also formerly covered, but are now shown on TG4 as part of a title sponsorship deal.

The 18 July 2010 episode was a special edition that had an audience of special guests to discuss.

An important recent development is the live broadcast throughout the world of championship football and hurling matches by Sky TV.

Presenters, pundits and commentators
The Sunday Game’s first edition was presented by Galway-based print journalist Jim Carney.  External commitments, however, resulted in him stepping aside as presenter the following year.  Former Dublin hurler, footballer, referee and sports journalist Seán Óg Ó Ceallacháin took over in 1980.  He remained at the helm as presenter for two seasons before being replaced by Carney once again.

Michael Lyster replaced Carney in 1984 as part of a revamp of the show, coinciding with the centenary year of the GAA.  When the show later expanded to feature live games, Lyster presented both The Sunday Game Live and The Sunday Game's highlights programme later the same evening.  Both shows were presented from the RTÉ Television Centre, however, a further expansion of the programme in 2004 saw Lyster presenting The Sunday Game Live from the venue of the big match.  Because of this former Kerry footballer and analyst Pat Spillane took over as presenter of the Sunday night highlights show. From the 2009 season Des Cahill replaced Spillane as host of the Sunday night highlights programme. In October 2022, Cahill announced that he would be stepping down from his role as host after 15 seasons of hosting. Jacqui Hurley was announced as Cahill's successor in January 2023.

In the early years, the programme's chief commentator was Michael O'Hehir, however, he only provided commentary for the senior All-Ireland finals. Mick Dunne, Micheál Ó Muircheartaigh, Jim Carney and Seán Óg Ó Ceallacháin all served as part of the commentary team in the early years. In 1980, Ger Canning joined the commentary team, becoming the programme's chief commentator following O'Hehir's retirement due to illness in time for the All-Ireland finals of 1985. He has commentated on every senior All-Ireland final since then, with Mícheál Ó Sé providing commentary in the Irish language on all All-Ireland semi-finals and finals in both codes in the minor grade.  In the late 1980s, Marty Morrissey became the latest addition to The Sunday Game’s commentary team.  He frequently commentates on provincial finals and All-Ireland semi-finals and has commentated on the All Ireland Hurling finals of 2017 and 2018 for RTÉ TV. An expansion of the programme in the 2000s (decade) saw Darragh Maloney become the latest member of the commentary team.

During the early and mid 1990s, Anne Cassin was the first women reporter and presenter.

The Sunday Game has always shown an innovative approach in its use of match analysts. In its very first season the makers of the programme made the brave decision to include Liz Howard as one of their main analysts.  Howard was an All-Ireland camogie winner who was the daughter of Garrett Howard, one of Limerick's all-time hurling greats. Other analysts during the programme's first season included Enda Colleran, a former Galway footballer, and Dave Weldrick, trainer of the Thomond College team that won the All-Ireland club football title.

Throughout the years The Sunday Game has featured many of hurling and football's greatest players as analysts and pundits.  These include:

Hurling: Jimmy Barry-Murphy, Eddie Brennan, Jimmy Brohan, D. J. Carey, Éamonn Cregan, Anthony Daly, John Doyle, Michael Duignan, Cyril Farrell, Davy Fitzgerald, Paul Flynn, Pete Finnerty, Pat Hartigan, Pat Henderson, Liam Griffin, Thomas Ryan, Eddie Keher, Phil 'Fan' Larkin, Ger Loughnane, Tomás Mulcahy, Larry O'Gorman, Dónal O'Grady, Declan Ruth, Henry Shefflin.

Football: Kevin Armstrong, Joe Brolly, Martin Carney, Enda Colleran, Paul Curran, Tony Davis, Seán Flanagan, Coman Goggins, Kevin Heffernan, Joe Lennon, Tommy Lyons, Jim McDonnell, Kevin McStay, Mick O'Connell, Mick O'Dwyer, Seán O'Neill, Anthony Tohill, Dave Weldrick, Eamon Young, Colm O'Rourke, Dessie Dolan, Lee Keegan, Michael Murphy

Former presenters

Theme music

For the 2004 season of the programme, RTÉ replaced the long-standing theme tune of The Sunday Game, Jägerlatein, composed by James Last, with a completely different composition. This was met with much comment (RTÉ had previously re-arranged the theme, then reverted to the original), and was likened to other iconic themes like the ones from Match of the Day, Grandstand, Test Match Special, Ski Sunday and Hockey Night in Canada being replaced. The new theme was used through to 2006 and was then replaced by another different theme in 2007. On 10 May 2008, RTÉ announced that the original theme would return, with a new arrangement, for the 2008 season.

See also
 League Sunday

References

External links
 

1979 Irish television series debuts
1970s Irish television series
1980s Irish television series
1990s Irish television series
2000s Irish television series
2010s Irish television series
Gaelic games on television
RTÉ Sport
RTÉ original programming